The Commissioners of the Republic (commissaires de la République) or Regional Commissioners of the Republic (CRR) were government officials appointed as representatives of Charles de Gaulle by the Provisional Government of the French Republic (GPRF) between 1944 and 1946. They had a rank equivalent to that of minister (like other commissioners of the GPRF) and were charged with re-establishing Republican legality and freedoms and the state's authority after the Liberation of France, answering only to de Gaulle.  Most of them originated from Free French Forces, though some also came from the French Resistance.

Holders
Maurice Papon
Michel Debré
Henri Fréville

Commissioners

Bibliography 
 Pierre Bertaux, La Libération de Toulouse et de sa région, Hachette, 1973 
 Henry Ingrand, Libération de l'Auvergne, Hachette, 1974
 Raymond Aubrac, Où la mémoire s'attarde, Le grand livre du mois 1996 
 Charles-Louis Foulon, Le Pouvoir en province à la Libération : les commissaires de la République 1943-1945, A. Colin 1975

Sources

Notes 

French civil servants
French Fourth Republic